Once Around the World is the second album by British progressive pop/rock band It Bites.

Released in 1988, Once Around the World was recorded at Manor Hill Studios in Oxfordshire. The first five of the album's nine tracks (on vinyl or cassette, the first side of the album) were produced by Steve Hillage and mostly feature the more single-driven pop approach preferred by the band's label, Virgin Records. One of these tracks, "Black December", was a re-recorded single b-side. The remaining tracks (including the almost fifteen-minute title track, the band's longest composition) were produced by It Bites with Mark Wallis and showcase their progressive rock influences.

The album produced three singles ("Kiss Like Judas", "Midnight" and a drastic edit of "Old Man and the Angel") and saw the band embark on a tour of the UK, US and Japan. Though both "Kiss Like Judas" and "Old Man and the Angel" charted, they failed to achieve hit status, peaking at number 76 and number 72 respectively, and Once Around the World is the only one of the three album It Bites released during their original run which failed to crack the UK Top 40.

Reception
According to Paul Stump's History of Progressive Rock, the album "would, in another epoch, have been seen as the album that broke [It Bites] as superstars. In 1988, it disappeared without a trace, lacking a suitable single to bolster it à la 'Calling All the Heroes'." He praised the album's combination of catchy melodies and intellectually stimulating rhythmic subtleties.

Track listing
 "Midnight" (4:04)
 "Kiss Like Judas" (4:08)
 "Yellow Christian" (6:29)
 "Rose Marie" (3:33)
 "Black December" (3:50)
 "Old Man and the Angel" (9:21) The UK vinyl release had a shortened version of this track (3:59)
 "Hunting the Whale" (4:46) CD only
 "Plastic Dreamer" (3:53)
 "Once Around the World" (14:46)

Personnel
It Bites
 Francis Dunnery – guitars, lead vocals
 John Beck – keyboards, backing & harmony vocals
 Dick Nolan – bass, backing vocals 
 Bob Dalton – drums, backing vocals

Additional personnel
 Mark Wallis – producer, engineer and mixer
 Nick Davis – engineer
 Nick Froome – engineer

Charts

References

External links 
 Official site discography

Albums produced by Steve Hillage
1988 albums
It Bites albums
Geffen Records albums
Virgin Records albums